Vietnamese passports (Vietnamese: Hộ chiếu Việt Nam) are issued to citizens of Vietnam to facilitate international travel. They enable the bearer to exit and re-enter Vietnam freely; to travel to and from other countries in accordance with visa requirements, and secure assistance from Vietnamese consular officials when abroad, if necessary.

All Vietnamese passports are issued by the Department of Immigration (Cục Quản lý Xuất nhập cảnh) on behalf of the Ministry of Public Security. Only Vietnamese citizens are eligible for this passport. The passport is valid for ten years. By law, a valid unexpired Vietnamese passport is conclusive proof of Vietnamese citizenship, and therefore can be used in lieu of a National ID card for identification (such as flying within Vietnam) domestically.

Vietnamese passport booklets conform with the recommended standards (i.e. size, composition, layout, technology) of the International Civil Aviation Organization (ICAO). There are three types of passport booklets. Vietnamese passports are property of the government of Vietnam and must be returned to the Vietnamese government upon demand.

History

North Vietnam (1954 - 1975) 
Passports were first issued in North Vietnam in 1959 when the first legislation regulating passport and went into effect. Under the legislation, the validity of passport was 3 years and can be extended, but for no more than 5 years since the original issuance date; and only those who were 18 and older were eligible for a passport.

In 1966, the North Vietnamese government passed a new law restricting the eligibility for passport. Effectively, only those who traveled aboard "for official purposes", including:

 Specialists and experts
 Journalists working for Vietnamese News Agency
 Students studying overseas

were eligible for regular passport.

State of Vietnam (1947 - 1954) and South Vietnam (1954 - 1975) 
Due to censorship from the government, not much is known about the passport of the former South Vietnam.

A passport with the name "Vietnam" was first issued under the State of Vietnam, which had a red cover at the time. The Republic of Vietnam also issued its own passports, but these were generally only available to the wealthy and high-ranking officials due to the exorbitant application fees.

Application
As of 1 July 2022, there are two methods of applying for a Vietnamese passport: fully online & hybrid (online & offline). Before that, the passport application in Vietnam was performed entirely offline; citizens came to the immigration office and submitted documents. Regardless of the method used, an application form is required for the issuance of a passport.

Forms 
There are 2 types of passport application form:

Fees
The Vietnamese passport is one of the cheapest in the world in terms of processing fees. As of 2022, the cost for a first-time passport or renewal (if applicant's most recent passport is undamaged and can be submitted with the application) is 200,000 Vietnamese đồng (VND); approximately US$7, and 400,000 Vietnamese đồng (VND) if applicant's most recent passport is damaged or stolen.

Visa requirements

As of 29 July 2022, Vietnamese citizens had visa-free or visa on arrival access to 55 countries and territories, ranking the Vietnamese passport 92th in the world according to the Visa Restrictions Index.

Vietnamese passport allows its bearer to stay up to 30 days visa-free, mostly in ASEAN countries. Otherwise, Vietnamese passport holders need to apply for visa in advance to gain entry to most other developed nations.

Passport design

Front cover 
Vietnamese passports are purple blue in colour, with the words "SOCIALIST REPUBLIC OF VIET NAM" and "CỘNG HÒA XÃ HỘI CHỦ NGHĨA VIỆT NAM" inscribed at the top of the front cover, and the emblem of Vietnam emblazoned in the centre of the front cover, whilst the words "HỘ CHIẾU" and "PASSPORT" are respectively inscribed below.

A current Vietnamese passport contains 48 pages and 2 purple blue cover pages. The cover is described by Vietnamese and English respectively, it makes Vietnamese passport become the only one passport which do not use French as description language in the former French Indo-China states when Laotian and Cambodian passport have the French description in cover.

Request page 
On the back of the front cover, there is a note from Vietnamese Government addressed to the authorities of all other states:

Signature and authority page page 
The signature page (which is located on the third page) has a blank section for the signature of a passport holder. A passport is not valid until it is signed by the passport holder in black or blue ink. If a holder is unable to sign his passport, it is to be signed by a person who has legal authority to sign on the holder's behalf.

The issuing authority is also printed on this page. If a passport is issued inside Vietnam, the issuing authority will be Cục Quản lý Xuất nhập cảnh/ Vietnam Immigration Department. If a passport is issued outside of Vietnam the issuing authority will be Đại sứ quán Việt Nam tại (quốc gia)/ Embassy of Vietnam in (country's name)

Data page 

The fourth page provides data of the passport bearer (visual inspection zone) and a machine readable zone:

 Type [of document, which is "P" for "personal", "D" for "diplomatic", "F" for "official"]
 Code [of the issuing country, which is "VNM" for "Vietnam"]
 Passport N° [Start with a letter (C for personal/regular passport; S for official passport; D for diplomatic passport), followed by 8 numbers]
 Full name (No separate between First name and Last name)
 Nationality (VIỆT NAM/VIETNAMESE)
 Date of birth
 Sex (M or F)
 ID card N°
 Date of issue
 Date of expiry
 Place of issue
 Machine readable zone

Prior to 1 July 2022, all Vietnamese passports had the "Place of birth" filed, which showed the province of birth of the holder (or the country of birth, if born overseas), The new passport design have removed this field, which has caused problem for immigration authorities, particularly in Europe (see below).

Visa pages 
Starting with the new design, selected nature hotspots and famous sights of Vietnam are printed in the inner pages, including:

 Hạ Long bay
 Hội An's old quarter
 My Son Sanctuary
 Lũng Cú flag tower
 Dragon Wharf (Bến Nhà Rồng)

Observations 

Located after the data page, the observation page contains the official seal of the Department of Immigration. In addition, the place of birth is printed here (upon request of the bearer).

Controversies 
The new passport redesign from July 2022 remove the "Place of birth" field on the passport. While place of birth isn't required in ICAO's passport standard, most countries include it in their passport (except South Korean passport, Swiss passport and Canadian passport - the latter only at request). As a result, some countries in the Schengen Area have refused to issue a visa and/or refuse admission to holder of new Vietnamese passport.

States' concerns and denials of admission

Germany 
On 28 July 2022, the German embassy in Hanoi released a press release saying it cannot grant visa to holders of Vietnam's new passports as they lack information of one's place of birth, making it difficult for verification. Vietnam's new passports, which began issuance since July 1, have not been recognized in Germany yet and their holders cannot apply for visa as the passports lack information regarding places of birth.

The press release further explained that: "German authorities cannot find information regarding places of birth based solely on a person's personal identification numbers as shown on their passports, it added. It means German authorities would need to verify one's identity manually with a 7-page list provided by the Vietnamese authorities, and not everyone has the list." As a result, holders of Vietnam's new passports, with dark blue cover instead of the traditional green ones, would not be able to apply for a C or D visa to enter Germany, and holders of the new passports who have already been granted a valid German visa could be denied entry at the border.

In response, the Vietnamese embassy in Germany will issue a certificate confirming the birthplace of holders of Vietnam's new passports. The embassy added that the two countries are "actively discussing" how to resolve the problems related to Germany's refusal to recognize the new Vietnamese passport on the grounds that it lacks information about the holder's place of birth.

Spain 
On 1 August 2022, the Spanish embassy in Hanoi released an announcement saying that they couldn't issue new visas to holder of the new Vietnamese passport, due to the lack of place of birth. The announcement said in detailed that: "Place of birth is an important information to identify passport holder, and is required for the issuance of a Schengen visa. Therefore, we cannot issue new visa to holder of new Vietnamese passport. As a result, Spanish authorities and authorities of other nations in Schengen bloc, are currently discussing ways to resolve this issue."

Czech Republic 
In a statement released in the morning of 2 August 2022, which in part read: "Vietnam's new passport issued on July 1 does not meet the technical standards of the International Civil Aviation Organization (ICAO). Therefore, the Czech Republic agrees with other member countries of the European Union (EU) to stop recognizing it." The statement however did not specify whether the Czech Republic will stop issuing visas for the new Vietnamese passports.

Finland 
On August 11, the Embassy of Finland in Hanoi announced on its official website that the country will suspend the recognition of Vietnam's blue-violet passports. Accordingly, the Embassy said that this new passport does not contain information about the passport holder's place of birth. This is required for personal identification and processing of Finnish visa/residence permit applications. Finland has decided to suspend the recognition of new model passports of Vietnam. The Embassy of Finland will not accept applications for a visa/residence permit from applicants presenting this new passport form until further notice from the Finnish authorities. The Embassy will notify in case of any changes. Finland will actively work with EU member states, Schengen and the Vietnamese side to solve this problem.

Consideration of the United States 
On August 12, the US Embassy in Hanoi and the Consulate General of this country in Ho Chi Minh City said that US authorities are still in the process of reviewing Vietnam's blue-violet passport. However, the receipt of applications and visa approval is still taking place as usual. For new visa applications, the United States requires applicants to add their place of birth to their passport's observations before applying. For visa applications that have been received and scheduled for an interview, the United States notes that applicants need to bring an old model passport (with place of birth), birth certificate, ID card, or any other any documents that show the applicant's place of birth during the interview.

Acceptance of admission into France 
The French Republic is the first country in the Schengen area to announce that they will continue to recognize the new passport of Vietnam (with a blue-purple color) and still issue visas as normal to applicants using this passport type. However, the French authorities note that Vietnamese citizens holding a new blue-violet model passport should pay attention to change their schedule, do not enter German territory even if they have been granted a Schengen visa by France, due to the denial of admission from Germany for this new Vietnamese passport.

Acceptance of admission into the United Kingdom 
In the announcement of the UK Embassy and Consulate in Vietnam ("UK in Vietnam") on August 3, the UK immigration authorities announced that they would continue to recognize the new passport model of Vietnam (issued from July 1). However, the UK representative in Vietnam also noted that applicants need to monitor and update their stay schedule in the Schengen countries after the previous denial statements of some countries in this bloc.

Diplomatic efforts and re-recognition decisions 
In a negotiation effort of the Vietnamese government and German diplomatic missions, on August 3, the representative of the Ministry of Public Security of Vietnam said that it would add birth information to the observations section of the new passport to serve for visa applications in countries that are temporarily not recognizing the new passport. Minister of Public Security - General To Lam said this is only a temporary measure. In the fourth quarter of 2022, the Ministry of Public Security will amend and add birthplace information to the new passport form, especially the chip-based passport model, which will be issued at the end of 2022.

After the negotiation period, the German authorities announced to temporarily recognize the new passport of Vietnam in case the citizen has been added the place of birth to the observations of the passport. The German Embassy in Hanoi said that for citizens using a new passport that has added the place of birth to their observations, visa issuance will be restarted immediately. However, the representative also noted that this is only a temporary measure, and only applies to short-term visas for business or visiting relatives (90 days), or long-term visas for international students. The long-term stay and work visa category C remains temporarily suspended until further notice.

On August 8, after the review period, the Spanish Embassy in Vietnam said that the central authorities of this country have made an official decision on the re-recognition of Vietnam's blue-violet passports. Accordingly, the Spanish authorities confirmed that Vietnam's new purple-blue passport fully meets international standards and contains all necessary information. However, because the Schengen visa application and management agency still requires verification of the place of birth in the visa application, the Spanish Embassy requires the Vietnamese applicant to add a birth certificate or ID card in the visa application to enter this country.

Gallery

Historic

Contemporary

See also 

 Visa requirements for Vietnamese citizens

References

External links
Vietnam Ministry of Public Security - Immigration Department

Vietnam